Sediliopsis patuxentia is an extinct species of sea snail, a marine gastropod mollusk in the family Pseudomelatomidae, the turrids and allies.

Description

Distribution
Fossils of this species were found in Miocene Strata of the Chesapeake Bay, Maryland, USA.

References

 Petuch & Drolshagen, Molluscan Paleontology of the Chesapeake; CRC Press, 2009

patuxentia
Gastropods described in 1904